Anathallis burzlaffiana is a species of orchid plant.

References 

burzlaffiana